The Santa Quiteria Bridge (Pont de Santa Quitèria in Catalan and Puente de Santa Quiteria in Spanish) is a medieval stone bridge between the towns of Vila-real and Almassora, in the Province of Castellón, Spain, that crosses the Mijares River. It is part of the ancient Royal Road near the Ermita de Santa Quiteria, in Almassora.

The bridge was recognized as Bien de interés cultural (place of cultural interest) on 16 June 2006, and given the designation ID RI-51-0011536.

References 

Bridges in the Valencian Community
Bien de Interés Cultural landmarks in the Province of Castellón
Stone bridges in Spain
Stone arch bridges